Cosmic Ray is a 1962 American experimental short film directed by Bruce Conner.

Synopsis
The film consists of many rapidly cut together visuals, including black-and-white footage of a nude woman with a pearl necklace, a couple of Mickey Mouse cartoons, and newsreel footage of atomic bomb explosions, all set to Ray Charles's "What'd I Say" (the one used in the film is featured on his 1973 live album).

See also
Jump cut
Music video
1962 in film

References

External links
 
 Letterboxd
 MoMA

1962 films
1960s avant-garde and experimental films
Collage film
Films directed by Bruce Conner
1962 short films
Ray Charles
1960s English-language films
1960s American films